XHXM-FM is a radio station on 89.1 FM in Jerez de García Salinas, Zacatecas. The station is owned by Grupo Radiofónico ZER and is known as Radio Jerez.

History
XHXM began as XEXM-AM 1360 in 1978. It was owned by Jesús Ávila Femat. The station would later move to 1150.

In 2012, XEXM applied to move to the lowest available frequency, which was 870. It also began its migration to FM as XHXM-FM 89.1.

In 2013, the concession for XEXM-XHXM was transferred to Arnoldo Rodríguez Zermeño.

References

Radio stations in Zacatecas
Radio stations established in 1978